Shahrdari Gorgan Basketball Club is an Iranian professional basketball club based in Gorgan, Iran. They compete in the Iranian Basketball Super League.

Established in 1969, the team plays its home games in the Gorgan Eagles Castle. Shahrdari has won two national championships, in 2021 and 2022.

Tournament records

Iranian Super League
 2001–02: 9th place
 2002–03: 5th place
 2003–04: 7th place
 2004–05: 9th place
 2005–06: 12th place
 2006–07: 5th place
 2007–08: 6th place
 2008–09: 8th place
 2009–10: 8th place
 2010–11: 7th place
 2011–12: 8th place
 2012–13: 4th place
 2013–14: 9th place
 2014–15: 4th place
 2015–16: 7th place
 2016–17: 9th place
 2017–18: 8th place
 2018–19: 2nd place 
2019–20: 1st place
2020–21: 1st place

External links
page on Asia-Basket

Basketball teams in Iran
Sport in Golestan Province
Basketball teams established in 2003